Robert Larry Mickey (October 21, 1943 — July 23, 1982) was a Canadian professional ice hockey right winger who played in the National Hockey League (NHL) with the Chicago Black Hawks, New York Rangers, Toronto Maple Leafs, Montreal Canadiens, Los Angeles Kings, Philadelphia Flyers and Buffalo Sabres between 1965 and 1975.

Playing career
While playing with the Omaha Knights, Mickey was named to the first team of the Central Hockey League All-Stars during the 1966-67 season, and his team advanced to the Adams Cup finals that same year.

On April 16, 1967, the night before the third game of the Adams Cup best-of-seven play-off series between the Omaha Knights and the Oklahoma City Blazers, Mickey was driving with his wife, Eleanor, on a country road near Seward, Nebraska late on Sunday night. The road's visibility was reduced to nearly zero as a result of blowing dust from a nearby field, and Mickey was involved in a two-car, head-on collision. Mickey suffered cuts, bruises and a broken left arm, while Eleanor was killed in the crash.

While Mickey had many accomplishments in the NHL, he was also known for his community involvement with youth hockey and children with special needs. Mickey is recognized as one of the early founders of the Buffalo Jr. Sabres. This franchise was established in Buffalo, New York in 1975. During its history, a half-dozen former Buffalo Sabres served as head coach or assistant coach. Mickey coached the team from 1975 to the end of the 1977 season.

Death
Mickey committed suicide in Buffalo on July 23, 1982.

Career statistics

Regular season and playoffs

References

External links
 

1943 births
1982 suicides
Buffalo Bisons (AHL) players
Buffalo Sabres players
Calgary Stampeders (WHL) players
Canadian expatriate ice hockey players in the United States
Canadian ice hockey coaches
Canadian ice hockey right wingers
Chicago Blackhawks players
Cincinnati Swords players
Edmonton Oil Kings (WCHL) players
Hampton Aces players
Ice hockey people from Alberta
Los Angeles Kings players
Minnesota Rangers players
Montreal Canadiens players
Montreal Voyageurs players
Moose Jaw Canucks players
New York Rangers players
Omaha Knights (CHL) players
People from Lacombe, Alberta
Philadelphia Flyers players
Salt Lake Golden Eagles (WHL) players
St. Louis Braves players
Suicides by carbon monoxide poisoning
Suicides in New York (state)
Toronto Maple Leafs players
Utica Mohawks players